The following outline is provided as an overview of and topical guide to Chad:

Chad – landlocked country in Central Africa.  It is bordered by Libya to the north, Sudan to the east, the Central African Republic to the south, Cameroon and Nigeria to the southwest, and Niger to the west. Due to its distance from the sea and its largely desert climate, the country is sometimes referred to as the "Dead Heart of Africa". Chad is divided into three major geographical regions: a desert zone in the north, an arid Sahelian belt in the centre and a more fertile Sudanese savanna zone in the south. Lake Chad, after which the country is named, is the largest wetland in Chad and the second largest in Africa. Chad's highest peak is the Emi Koussi in the Sahara, and N'Djamena, the capital, is the largest city. Chad is home to over 200 different ethnic and linguistic groups. Arabic and French are the official languages. Islam is the most widely practiced religion. While many political parties are active, power lies firmly in the hands of President Déby and his political party, the Patriotic Salvation Movement. Chad remains plagued by political violence and recurrent attempted coups d'état (see Battle of N'Djamena (2006) and Battle of N'Djamena (2008)). The country is one of the poorest and most corrupt countries in the world; most Chadians live in poverty as subsistence herders and farmers. Since 2003 crude oil has become the country's primary source of export earnings, superseding the traditional cotton industry.

General reference

 Pronunciation: 
 Common English country name:  Chad
 Official English country name:  The Republic of Chad
 Common endonym(s): تشاد, Tchad  
 Official endonym(s): جمهورية تشاد, République du Tchad  
 Adjectival(s): Chadian
 Demonym(s):
 ISO country codes: TD, TCD, 148
 ISO region codes: See ISO 3166-2:TD
 Internet country code top-level domain: .td

Geography of Chad 

Geography of Chad
 Chad is: a landlocked country
 Location:
 Northern Hemisphere and Eastern Hemisphere
 Africa
 Central Africa
 Middle Africa
 North Africa
 partially within the Sahara Desert
 Time zone: West Africa Time (UTC+01)
 Extreme points of Chad
 High:  Emi Koussi 
 Low:  Bodélé Depression 
 Land boundaries:  5,968 km
 1,360 km
 1,197 km
 1,175 km
 1,094 km
 1,055 km
 87 km
 Coastline:  none
 Population of Chad: 10,780,600(2007) - 75th most populous country

 Area of Chad:  - 21st largest country
 Atlas of Chad
 Top right corner of Chad has an angle of around 110 °

Environment of Chad 

 Climate of Chad
 Ecoregions in Chad
 Geology of Chad
 Protected areas of Chad
 National parks of Chad
 Wildlife of Chad
 Fauna of Chad
 Birds of Chad
 Mammals of Chad

Natural geographic features of Chad 

 Glaciers in Chad: none 
 Lakes of Chad
 Mountains of Chad
 Volcanoes in Chad
 Rivers of Chad
 World Heritage Sites in Chad: None

Regions of Chad

Ecoregions of Chad 

List of ecoregions in Chad

Administrative divisions of Chad 

Administrative divisions of Chad
 Regions of Chad
 Departments of Chad
 Sub-prefectures of Chad

Provinces of Chad 

Provinces of Chad

Departments of Chad 

Departments of Chad

Sub-prefectures of Chad

Municipalities of Chad 

 Capital of Chad: N'Djamena
 Cities of Chad

Demography of Chad 

Demographics of Chad

Government and politics of Chad 

Politics of Chad
 Form of government: presidential republic
 Capital of Chad: N'Djamena
 Elections in Chad
 Political parties in Chad

Branches of government

Government of Chad

Executive branch of the government of Chad 
 Head of country: President of Chad
 Head of government: President of Chad

Legislative branch of the government of Chad 

 National Assembly of Chad (unicameral)

Judicial branch of the government of Chad 

Court system of Chad
 Supreme Court of Chad

Foreign relations of Chad 

Foreign relations of Chad
 Diplomatic missions in Chad
 Diplomatic missions of Chad

International organization membership 
The Republic of Chad is a member of:

African, Caribbean, and Pacific Group of States (ACP)
African Development Bank Group (AfDB)
African Union (AU)
Conference des Ministres des Finances des Pays de la Zone Franc (FZ)
Development Bank of Central African States (BDEAC)
Economic and Monetary Community of Central Africa (CEMAC)
Food and Agriculture Organization (FAO)
Group of 77 (G77)
International Atomic Energy Agency (IAEA)
International Bank for Reconstruction and Development (IBRD)
International Civil Aviation Organization (ICAO)
International Criminal Court (ICCt)
International Criminal Police Organization (Interpol)
International Development Association (IDA)
International Federation of Red Cross and Red Crescent Societies (IFRCS)
International Finance Corporation (IFC)
International Fund for Agricultural Development (IFAD)
International Labour Organization (ILO)
International Monetary Fund (IMF)
International Olympic Committee (IOC)
International Red Cross and Red Crescent Movement (ICRM)
International Telecommunication Union (ITU)

International Telecommunications Satellite Organization (ITSO)
International Trade Union Confederation (ITUC)
Islamic Development Bank (IDB)
Multilateral Investment Guarantee Agency (MIGA)
Nonaligned Movement (NAM)
Organisation internationale de la Francophonie (OIF)
Organisation of Islamic Cooperation (OIC)
Organisation for the Prohibition of Chemical Weapons (OPCW)
United Nations (UN)
United Nations Conference on Trade and Development (UNCTAD)
United Nations Educational, Scientific, and Cultural Organization (UNESCO)
United Nations Industrial Development Organization (UNIDO)
United Nations Operation in Cote d'Ivoire (UNOCI)
Universal Postal Union (UPU)
World Confederation of Labour (WCL)
World Customs Organization (WCO)
World Federation of Trade Unions (WFTU)
World Health Organization (WHO)
World Intellectual Property Organization (WIPO)
World Meteorological Organization (WMO)
World Tourism Organization (UNWTO)
World Trade Organization (WTO)

Law and order in Chad 

Law of Chad
 Constitution of Chad
 Human rights in Chad
 LGBT rights in Chad
 Freedom of religion in Chad
 Law enforcement in Chad

Military of Chad 

Military of Chad
 Command
 Commander-in-chief:
 Forces
 Army of Chad
 Navy of Chad
 Air Force of Chad
 Military history of Chad

Local government in Chad 

Local government in Chad

History of Chad 

History of Chad
Current events of Chad
 Military history of Chad

Culture of Chad 

Culture of Chad
 Chadian cuisine
 Languages of Chad
 National symbols of Chad
 Coat of arms of Chad
 Flag of Chad
 National anthem of Chad
 People of Chad
 Public holidays in Chad
 Religion in Chad
 Christianity in Chad
 Hinduism in Chad
 Islam in Chad
 Sikhism in Chad
 World Heritage Sites in Chad: None

Art in Chad 
 Literature of Chad
 Music of Chad

Sports in Chad 

Sports in Chad
 Football in Chad
 Chad at the Olympics

Economy and infrastructure of Chad 

Economy of Chad
 Economic rank, by nominal GDP (2007): 128th (one hundred and twenty eighth)
 Agriculture in Chad
 Communications in Chad
 Internet in Chad
 Companies of Chad
Currency of Chad: Franc
ISO 4217: XAF
 Energy in Chad
 Health care in Chad
 Mining in Chad
 Petroleum industry in Chad
 Tourism in Chad
 Transport in Chad
 Airports in Chad
 Rail transport in Chad

Education in Chad 

Education in Chad

Health in Chad 

Health in Chad

See also

Chad

Index of Chad-related articles
List of Chad-related topics
List of international rankings
Member state of the United Nations
Outline of Africa
Outline of geography

References

External links

  Official government site
  Official presidency site
Chad Embassy — Washington DC

Chad
Chad